Siwan is a city and nagar parishad in the Indian state of Bihar. It is the administrative headquarters of Siwan district and one of the urban settlements out of three in the district. It is located close to Uttar Pradesh.

History

The Siwan Municipal Council (SMC) was established in 1924. It was the subdivisional headquarters of Siwan subdivision under the old Saran district. It became district headquarters of the Siwan district when it was formed in 1972.

Geography and climate
Siwan city is located at coordinates  Latitude and longitude. It is counted in one of the tarai region of Himalaya Mountain range. Daha River, which is a small river, which floods in rainy season pass through the west of the town. The river starts drying up during the summer. The green area in Siwan is about (21%) of its area.

The weather of Siwan is generally mild cool throughout the year and temperature falls down up to 4 °C in December and January but it is warm in May, June and July. This climate is considered to be Cwa according to the Köppen-Geiger climate classification. and is best suited for agriculture.

Demographics
As of 2011 Indian Census, Siwan had a total population of 135,066, of which 70,756 were males and 64,310 were females. Population within the age group of 0 to 6 years was 18,282. The total number of literates in Siwan was 92,967, which constituted 68.8% of the population with male literacy of 73.6% and female literacy of 63.6%. The effective literacy rate of 7+ population of Siwan was 79.6%, of which male literacy rate was 85.2% and female literacy rate was 73.5%. The Scheduled Castes and Scheduled Tribes population was 8,244 and 1,514 respectively. Siwan had 21223 households in 2011.

 India census, Siwan had a population of 108,172 of which 57,223 were male and 50,949 female.

Religion
Majority of the people follow Hinduism (65%), followed by Islam (34%). Small populations of followers of Christianity, Sikhism, Buddhism and Jainism are also present in the city.

Transport

Roadways
NH-531 connects Siwan to Gopalganj and Chhapra. NH-531 meets to NH-27 at Gopalganj. Which is second longest road in India. Bihar State Highway-47 connects Barharia, Mairwa and Guthani to Siwan. State Highway-73 and 89 also connects Siwan to nearest town and villages.

Railways
There is a Siwan Junction railway station in Siwan which connects to major cities of India.

Airways
There is no airport in Siwan. Jay Prakash Narayan Airport which is situated 140 km away in Patna is the nearest airport. Gorakhpur Airport (100 km) and Kushinagar Airport (95 km) are other nearby airports.

Notable people

Manoj Bhawuk
Mihir Diwakar
Prabhavati Devi
Satyendra Dubey
Meeran Haider
Ramesh Singh Kushwaha
Akhilendra Mishra
Natwarlal
Mangal Pandey
Nirupama Pandey
Chandrashekhar Prasad
Rajendra Prasad 1st President of India
Sunil Prasad
Syed Ali Akhtar Rizvi
Mohammad Shahabuddin
Kaushalendra Pratap Shahi
Jai Prakash Narayan Singh
Ramdev Singh
Shyam Bahadur Singh
Vashishtha Narayan Singh
Indradeep Sinha
Kavita Singh, Indian politician
Janardan Tiwari
Raza Naqvi Wahi
Khesari Lal Yadav
Om Prakash Yadav
 Famyas Siwani, Indian Urdu poet

References

 
Cities and towns in Siwan district